Minooa is a monotypic snout moth genus described by Hiroshi Yamanaka in 1996. Its only species, Minooa yamamotoi, described in the same publication, is known from Osaka, Japan, where it was described from Minoo Park.

References

Moths described in 1996
Pyralinae
Moths of Japan
Monotypic moth genera
Pyralidae genera